Burney is an unincorporated community in Clay Township, Decatur County, Indiana.

History
Burney was laid out in 1882. Burney was the name of a local family. A post office was established at Burney in 1884, and remained in operation until it was discontinued in 1995.

Geography

Notable person
Leroy Edgar Burney, Surgeon General under Eisenhower, was born at Burney, Indiana. Burney is noted as the first to publicly establish a causal relationship between lung cancer and cigarette smoking.

References

Unincorporated communities in Decatur County, Indiana
Unincorporated communities in Indiana